For lists of rocks in Western Australia, please see:

List of rocks in Western Australia, A-B, plus numerals
List of rocks in Western Australia, C-E
List of rocks in Western Australia, F-K
List of rocks in Western Australia, L-N
List of rocks in Western Australia, O-S
List of rocks in Western Australia, T-Z

See also 
 Geology of Western Australia
 Granite outcrops of Western Australia

Rocks
 
Lists of tourist attractions in Western Australia
Lists of rocks
Western Australia